Sparganothis vocaridorsana is a species of moth of the family Tortricidae. It is found in North America, including Alberta, British Columbia, Colorado, Idaho, Manitoba, Montana, New Mexico, the Northwest Territory, Oregon, Quebec, Saskatchewan, Utah, Washington and Wyoming.

The wingspan is 21–27 mm.

References

Moths described in 1905
Sparganothis